Jason Bulmahn is an American game designer who has written or contributed to several works.

Career
Jason Bulmahn coordinated the world's largest organized play D&D campaign for the RPGA (Living Greyhawk), and then joined Paizo Publishing as the managing editor of Dragon in 2004. In 2007, Bulmahn took over as lead designer of Paizo Publishing, LLC. Within two months of Wizards of the Coast's August 2007 announcement of D&D fourth edition, Bulmahn began working on a new edition of the d20 system that updated and cleaned up the rules, and that he referred to as "a small side project". When Paizo decided not to wait to see how Wizards of the Coast would allow third-party publishers to support this new edition, Paizo turned Bulmahn's side project into a complete RPG with their own set of d20 game system core rules; Paizo thus announced the Pathfinder Roleplaying Game on March 18, 2008. Bulmahn became the lead designer of the Pathfinder Roleplaying Game.

The Beta version of the Pathfinder RPG received the gold ENnie award for "best free product or web enhancement" in 2008. He has also written or contributed to Pathfinder books such as Carnival of Tears, as well as Dragon and Dungeon articles and books such as Secrets of Xen'drik, Expedition to the Ruins of Greyhawk, Dungeonscape, and Elder Evils.

His RPG design credits include the Pathfinder Roleplaying Game Core Rulebook, Bestiary, Ultimate Guides, the Advanced Player's Guide, the Beginner Box, and 2013's Mythic Adventures. His work has earned one Origins Award and numerous ENnie Awards, including Best Game and Product of the Year for that past three years in a row.

He is the publisher of Minotaur Games, a company dedicated to creating products compatible with the Pathfinder Roleplaying Game as well as card and board games.

References

External links
Codex of the Infinite Pains, Jason Bulmahn's RPG blog.
Minotaur Games website.

American magazine editors
Dungeons & Dragons game designers
Living people
Pathfinder
Year of birth missing (living people)